The Compromise of 1877, also known as the Wormley Agreement or the Bargain of 1877, was an unwritten deal, informally arranged among members of the United States Congress, to settle the intensely disputed 1876 presidential election between Republican  Rutherford B. Hayes and Democrat Samuel J. Tilden. The Democrats agreed to the election of Hayes and in turn he withdrew the Army from the South, leaving the Democrats in control there.  The Compromise itself secured Hayes's authority as a political fact, and the subsequent withdrawal of the last federal troops from the Southern United States, effectively ending the Reconstruction Era and forfeiting the Republican claims to the state governments in South Carolina, Florida and Louisiana.

Under the compromise, Democrats controlling the House of Representatives allowed the decision of the Electoral Commission to take effect. The outgoing president, Republican Ulysses S. Grant, removed the soldiers from Florida, and as president, Hayes removed the remaining troops from South Carolina and Louisiana. As soon as the troops left, many white Republicans also left, and the "Redeemer" Democrats, who already dominated other state governments in the South, took control. Some black Republicans felt betrayed as they lost their power in the South that had been propped up by the federal military, and by 1905 most black people were effectively disenfranchised in every Southern state.

The existence of an informal agreement to secure Hayes's political authority, long known as the Bargain of 1877, was long accepted as a part of American history. Its supposed terms were reviewed and revised by historian C. Vann Woodward in his 1951 book Reunion and Reaction: The Compromise of 1877 and the End of Reconstruction, which also coined the name in an effort to compare the political resolution of the election to the famous Missouri Compromise and Compromise of 1850. Criticism from other historians has taken various forms, ranging from outright rejection of the Compromise theory to criticism of Woodward's emphasis of certain influences or outcomes, but critics concede that the theory became almost universally accepted in the years after Woodward published Reunion and Reaction.

Background 

In the November 1876 United States presidential election, Samuel J. Tilden received 184 uncontested electoral votes and Rutherford B. Hayes received 165, with 185 votes necessary for a majority. Four states (Florida, Louisiana, Oregon, and South Carolina) returned disputed slates of presidential electors with a total of twenty electoral votes at stake. Any of the disputes being resolved in Tilden's favor would secure him the presidency, while Hayes needed all twenty votes to be certified in his favor. To resolve these disputes in the absence of a clear constitutional directive, Congress passed the Electoral Commission Act, which established a 15-member commission of eight Republicans and seven Democrats to review the contested elections. 

The Commission voted 8-7, along party lines, to certify each disputed election in favor of Hayes. Under the Act, the Commission's findings were final unless rejected by both the Senate and House of Representatives. The Senate, controlled by Republicans, declined to do so, but Democratic Representatives in the House resorted to dilatory tactics by raising spurious objections to electors from Vermont and Wisconsin and filibustering the debate on those objections. However, the Democratic Speaker of the House, Samuel J. Randall, refused to entertain the dilatory motions and eventually, the filibusterers gave up.

At 4:10 am on March 2, President pro tempore of the Senate Thomas W. Ferry announced that Hayes had been elected to the presidency by an electoral margin of 185–184.

Terms of compromise
The compromise essentially stated that Southern Democrats would acknowledge Hayes as president by ending their filibuster of the election, on the understanding that Republicans would meet certain demands. The following elements are generally said to be the points of the compromise:
 The removal of all remaining U.S. military forces from the former Confederate states. At the time, U.S. troops remained only in Louisiana, South Carolina, and Florida, but the Compromise completed their withdrawal from the region.
 The appointment of at least one Southern Democrat to Hayes' cabinet. (David M. Key of Tennessee was appointed as Postmaster General.)
 The construction of another transcontinental railroad using the Texas and Pacific in the South (this had been part of the "Scott Plan", proposed by Thomas A. Scott of the Pennsylvania Railroad; he had initiated negotiations resulting in the final compromise).
 Legislation to help industrialize the South and restore its economy following the Civil War and Reconstruction.
 The right to deal with black people without northern interference.

After the Compromise, a few Democrats complained loudly that Tilden had been cheated. There was talk of forming armed units that would march on Washington, but President Grant tightened military security, and nobody marched on Washington.

Hayes was peacefully inaugurated. Points 1 and 2 of the compromise took effect. Hayes had already announced his support for the restoration of "home rule", which would involve federal troop removal, before the election. At the time, it was not unusual, nor unexpected, for a president, especially one so narrowly elected, to select a cabinet member favored by the other party. Points 3 and 4 were never enacted; it is possible there was no firm agreement about them.

Whether by informal deal or simply reassurances already in line with Hayes's announced plans, talks with Southern Democrats satisfied the worries of many. This prevented a congressional filibuster that had threatened to extend resolution of the election dispute beyond Inauguration Day 1877.

Historiography
Because of the paucity of documentary evidence or publicity, which Woodward attributes to the nature of the negotiations and agreement, the existence and nature of the Compromise have been hotly debated by historians.

Contemporary accounts of the 1877 crisis lack any discussion of backroom negotiations. Neither Abram Hewitt's papers nor a 1901 history written by select committee secretary Milton H. Northrup mentions any sort of deal to secure Hayes's presidency, though Woodward argues that neither man would have been privy to such talks. In his 1913 "inside history" of the crisis, Henry Watterson recounts a White House dinner during the first Grover Cleveland administration, at which four unnamed insiders attempted to outdo each other in revealing the most salacious secret from the 1877 crisis, though Watterson himself concludes "the whole truth... will never be known." Despite the lack of solid contemporary accounts, after the crisis the story of a "Bargain of 1877" had gradually come to plausibly explain how Southern Democrats, though convinced that Tilden was the lawful President, were persuaded to recognize Hayes's authority.

In 1951, C. Vann Woodward attempted to reconstruct a complete version of the "Compromise of 1877" (in reference to the Compromises of 1820, 1824, 1850, and failed Compromises of 1861) in Reunion and Reaction: The Compromise of 1877 and the End of Reconstruction.  Emerging business and industry interests of the New South found common ground with Republican businessmen, particularly with the railroads. They met secretly at Wormley's Hotel in Washington to forge a compromise with aid to internal improvements: bridges, canals and railroads wanted by the South. However, Peskin notes that no serious federal effort was made after Hayes took office to fund a railroad or provide other federal aid for improvements. An opposing interest group representing the Southern Pacific actually thwarted Scott's proposed Texas and Pacific scheme, and ultimately ran its own line to New Orleans.

Some historians, such as Allan Peskin, argue that the assurances offered to some Southern Democrats to prevent a filibuster were not a compromise but a foregone conclusion, as Tilden did not command sufficient support. Peskin admits that Woodward's interpretation had become almost universally accepted in the nearly quarter century since he had published it. As not all terms of the agreement were met, Peskin believes there was really no deal between the North and South in 1877. He also suggests that Northern Democrats were more significant in quashing the filibuster than those from the South. For instance, Samuel J. Randall (D-Pennsylvania) was Speaker of the House and prevented the filibuster. He was more interested in ensuring that the Radical state government in Louisiana was abandoned than in any southern railroad.

Vincent DeSantis argues that the Republican Party abandoned Southern blacks to the rule of the racist Democratic Party in order to gain the support of white Democrats for Hayes' presidency.

In any case, Reconstruction ended. The dominance of the Democratic Party in the South was cemented with the ascent of the "Redeemer" governments that displaced the Republican governments. After 1877, support for white supremacy generally caused whites to vote for Democrats and the region became known as the "Solid South". Until the end of the 19th century, black Republicans continued to elect numerous candidates to local office, although Democrats controlled most state representative and statewide seats, except for a brief period, roughly between 1877 and 1900, during which some fusion governments and candidates – supported both by Republicans and by Populists or another third party – were occasionally elected to state-level offices, particularly in North Carolina prior to the Wilmington insurrection of 1898. The majority of white voters supported national Democratic candidates well into the 20th century before shifting to the Republican Party. This later shift to the Republican party followed the Civil Rights Act of 1964, which was introduced by Democratic President Lyndon B. Johnson and supported by most Democrats and Republicans, while heavily disfavored by southern Democrats and Republicans.

In The Mexicanization of American Politics: The United States' Transnational Path from Civil War to Stabilization (2012), Gregory P. Downs rejects the idea that this was an era of easy reconciliation and political stability. Instead he shows many Americans feared "Mexicanization" of politics, whereby force would be used to settle a presidential election, as force had been used to settle certain state elections in the South. Downs explores how Mexicanization was roundly rejected and stability was achieved.

Whatever deals may or may not have taken place on the side, in formal legal terms, the election of 1876 was not decided by such acts, but by the official vote of Congress to accept the recommendations of the Electoral Commission they themselves had set up as a way out of the election impasse. The expectation in setting up the committee had been that its decisions would be accepted by Congress. It was only when certain Democrats disagreed with the commission's decisions in favor of Hayes that this arrangement was jeopardized. This Democratic group threatened a filibuster (opposed by Republicans and Congressional Democratic leadership as well) that would prevent the agreed-upon vote from taking place. Discussions of the points in the alleged compromise were related to persuading key Democrats against accepting a filibuster. The very threat of a filibuster—a measure used by a minority to prevent a vote—indicates that there were already sufficient votes for accepting the commission's recommendations.

References
Informational notes 

Citations

Bibliography

 Benedict, Michael Les.  "Southern Democrats in the Crisis of 1876-1877: A Reconsideration of Reunion and Reaction." Journal of Southern History (1980): 489–524. in JSTOR

 DeSantis, Vincent P. "Rutherford B. Hayes and the Removal of the Troops and the End of Reconstruction" in Region, Race and Reconstruction edited by Morgan Kousser and James McPherson. (Oxford University Press, 1982) pp. 417–50. 
 
 Frantz, Edward O. The Door of Hope: Republican Presidents and the First Southern Strategy, 1877–1933 (University Press of Florida. 2011)
 Huntzicker, William E. "Thomas Nast, Harper’s Weekly, and the Election of 1876." in After The War (Routledge, 2017) pp. 53-68.

 Palen, Marc‐William. "Election of 1876/Compromise of 1877." in A Companion to the Reconstruction Presidents 1865–1881 (2014): 415-430.

 
 Polakoff, Keith Ian. The Politics of Inertia: The Election of 1876 and the End of Reconstruction (1973)
 
 Simpson, Brooks D. "Ulysses S. Grant and the Electoral Crisis of 1876-1877," Hayes Historical Journal (1992) 11#2 pp 5–22. 

 Skidmore, Max J. "Rutherford B. Hayes." in Maligned Presidents: The Late 19th Century (2014): 50-62.

 

 Zuckerwise, Lena. " 'There Can Be No Loser': White Supremacy and the Cruelty of Compromise." American Political Thought 5.3 (2016): 467-493. online

External links
Samueltilden.com: History of Samuel J. Tilden website  
Rbhayes.org: R. B. Hayes Presidential Library
Southernspaces.org: "Corporations, Corruption, and the Modern Lobby: A Gilded Age Story of the West and the South in Washington, D.C." — by Richard White in Southern Spaces (16 April 2009).

1876 United States presidential election
1877 in American politics
Reconstruction Era
Political history of the United States
African-American history between emancipation and the civil rights movement
History of the Southern United States
Rutherford B. Hayes
Political compromises in the United States